The Star of the Commander of Valour is a medal awarded by the Malaysian government. The award was established on 29 July 1960, and it was formally gazetted by an act of parliament on 11 August 1960. It is Malaysia's second highest gallantry award, coming in second only to the Grand Knight of Valour. 

Only members of the military (i.e. all services under the Malaysian Armed Forces) and members of law enforcement forces (e.g. Royal Malaysia Police and Malaysia Coast Guard) are eligible for the award. It can be bestowed posthumously.

When compared to British Armed Forces military awards, this award is equivalent to the Conspicuous Gallantry Cross.

Act 616 
Living recipients receive a monthly allowance of RM300, according to Akta 616-Akta Panglima Gagah Berani (Elaun Kenangan) 2001. Posthumous recipients' next of kin receive RM 15,000 in compensation. This award may be given to the same person more than once.

The allowance may be revoked if any of the following conditions are met:

 The recipient passed away.
 The recipient is guilty of federal offences.
 The award was revoked in accordance with Section VIII of the Panglima Gagah Berani Statute.

Appearance 
The medal is made of pure silver and is shaped like a five-pointed star. On the star, two Kris lie beneath the Malaysian royal crown. A ribbon with 45° stripes slanting right holds the star. Stripes come in red, white, blue, and yellow.

List of recipients 

As of the year 2021, 114 people have been awarded the Star of the Commander of Valour.

Notable recipients

Baharin Abd Jalil
Major Baharin bin Abd Jalil, (Service number: 410560), was a Platoon Commander in A Company of the 1st Battalion, Malaysian Ranger Regiment (1 RANGER) at the time. He was a Leftenan Muda ('2nd Lieutenant') at the time. In Operation Hentam, he was tasked with conducting blocks in various locations around Kampung Goebilt, Sarawak. Blocks are positions where a unit, the anvil, acts as a stopping force. The pursuing force, the hammer, would fire-fight the enemy into the anvil, where it would be efficiently decimated. In jungle warfare, the "Hammer and Anvil" tactic is widely used.

Two Communist terrorists met the villagers of Kampung Goebilt on 12 March 1971, to obtain food supplies. The villagers obliged by providing them with food, and the members of the 1 RANGER were quickly informed. As a result, one of the food-collecting terrorists was apprehended. Baharin divided his platoon into small groups after gathering more information. He joined forces with Ranger Lan Gima. These two were successful in detecting a group of enemies. The enemy group was estimated to number around ten people. They were successful in making contact with the enemy.

In a fierce moving gunfight, these two formidable characters engaged the enemy. Baharin and Lan Gima killed 13 of the enemy themselves. The King awarded the PGB to 2Lt Baharin bin Abd Jalil for valour in the highest Ranger Corps traditions. He left the military with the rank of Major.

David Fu Chee Ming
Captain (retd) , (b. 1945; Service number: 200772), was the Platoon Commander of the 8th Platoon of C Company, 4th Battalion, Malaysian Ranger Regiment at the time. He was tasked with tracking and destroying the enemy in his sector of operation in the Tanah Hitam area of Perak. He was a Leftenan Muda ('2nd Lieutenant') at the time.

On 27 August 1970, his platoon of 24 men came into contact with a group of approximately 70 enemy combatants. The enemy had accidentally entered his sector. Thus began a 7-hour-long heavy and intense battle. The men fought on under his unwavering leadership, killing four of the enemy. There were no casualties on his patrol.

The King awarded him the PGB for his outstanding gallantry and bravery in the finest traditions of the Ranger Corps. He retired as a Captain after a distinguished career.

Ielias Ibrahim
Warrant Officer Class 1 (retd) Ielias bin Ibrahim is the only PGB recipient from the Malaysian Army's reserve unit, the Territorial Army Regiment. Ielias retired as Regimental Sergeant Major of the Reserve Officer Training Unit at Universiti Sains Malaysia.

Ismail Salleh
Colonel (retd) , (Service number: 12171), then Company Commander of the 6th Battalion, Malaysian Ranger Regiment, was tasked with carrying out Operation Badak in the Pelam Estate area of Klian Intan, Perak. He held the rank of Mejar ('Major') at the time. This operation was launched in response to intelligence that a group of enemy infiltrators had infiltrated the area via the Thai-Malaysian border.

Ismail, along with Platoons 8 and 9, entered the area of operation around 3 a.m. on 23 August 1970, with the intention of blocking enemy infiltrators. Platoon 8 made contact with the enemy's forward elements around 4 p.m. on the same day. Four of the enemy were killed in a brief and fierce firefight. As a result, the enemy staged a withdrawal. The enemy launched a counterattack against Platoon 8 after a few minutes. At the same time, Ismail and Platoon 9 were targeted by another enemy group. The Battalion's HQ at Klian Intan Camp requested artillery support. Ismail and his group were able to surround the enemy while waiting for the requested artillery support. In this position, he and his group exchanged fire with the enemy, killing one and wounding several others. As artillery fire rained down on the enemy, he ordered his men to keep firing on the encircled enemies. The enemy was estimated to number around 70 people and to be armed with automatic weapons and high explosives.

The fight lasted seven hours. His Majesty the King bestowed the PGB on Major Ismail bin Salleh for his bravery in the face of the enemy. He left the military with the rank of Colonel.

Kanang Langkau

Warrant Officer Class 1 (retd) Temenggung Datuk Kanang anak Langkau, (b. 1945; d. 2013; Service number: 901738), of Simanggang, Sarawak, was a Malaysian soldier from the 8th Battalion, Malaysian Ranger Regiment (today known as the 8th Battalion (Parachute), Royal Ranger Regiment) who was awarded the Seri Pahlawan Gagah Perkasa. He is the only person in the Malaysian Armed Forces to have received two of the highest gallantry awards.

On 21 April 1962, he enlisted in the British Army as an Iban Tracker with the Sarawak Rangers. After Malaysia was established, he was absorbed into the Malaysian Rangers. He retired from the military after 21 years of service as a Warrant Officer Class 1.
On the 1st of June 1979, while on a reconnaissance mission in the Korbu Forest Reserve (Fort Legap), he came across an enemy camp and attacked it against forces that outnumbered his own. As a result of the encounter, two rangers and five enemies were killed. Enemy equipment was also confiscated. He was awarded the "Pingat Gagah Berani" for his actions.

Lan Gima
Ranger Lan anak Gima (Service number: 901111) served in the 1 RANGER. During Operation Hentam on 12 March 1971, he joined 2nd Lieutenant Baharin Abd Jalil on a manhunt mission. These two were able to detect a group of enemies numbering in the tens. They started the firefight and engaged in a fierce moving firefight with the enemy. Baharin and Lan Gima killed 13 enemies between them. The PGB was bestowed by the King on Ranger Lan anak Gima.

Mohd Ghazali Che Mat 
General (retd) Tan Sri Mohd Ghazali bin Haji Che Mat was one of the first four recipients of the award. The four soldiers received the award on Malaysian Independence Day, two years before the award was officially gazetted by the Malaysian government. Mohd Ghazali, then Leftenan Muda ('2nd Lieutenant'), led Platoon 1 from A Company, 2nd Battalion, Malay Regiment on a routine patrol on 13 November 1957. The platoon notices an enemy platoon on top of a hill. Platoon 1 was spotted by the enemy while climbing the hill to set up an ambush and was pinned down by enemy shots from the top of the hill. Mohd Ghazali and one of his platoon members, Private Hassan Selati, decide to do a suicide charge towards the enemy's position after being unable to move for a long time, and they manage to kill two of the enemy. The enemy withdrew from their position after being surprised by the supposedly final charge from the two brave men, and Platoon 1 survived the firefight. The enemy platoon was later identified as the 37th/39th Liberation Platoon of the 5th Malayan Communist Party Regiment. Mohd Ghazali was appointed as the 8th Chief of the Defence Forces on 1 November 1985.

Voon Ken Hong
Chief Inspector (retd) Voon Ken Hong was a Malaysian intelligence police officer and Special Branch secret agent who participated in Operation Taloong during the Communist insurgency in Malaysia (1968–89). Voon retired from the service as a Chief Inspector in 1997.

References

External links
 Malaysia: Star of the Commander of Valour

Military awards and decorations of Malaysia
Awards established in 1960
1960 establishments in Malaya